Zilephus is a genus of dwarf spiders containing the single species, Zilephus granulosus. It was  first described by Eugène Simon in 1902, and is only found in Argentina.

References

External links

Linyphiidae
Monotypic Araneomorphae genera